Ras-related protein Ral-A (RalA) is a protein that in humans is encoded by the RALA gene on chromosome 7. This protein is one of two paralogs of the Ral protein, the other being RalB, and part of the Ras GTPase family. RalA functions as a molecular switch to activate a number of biological processes, majorly cell division and transport, via signaling pathways. Its biological role thus implicates it in many cancers.

Structure 
The Ral isoforms share an 80% overall match in amino acid sequence and 100% match in their effector-binding region. The two isoforms mainly differ in the C-terminal hypervariable region, which contains multiple sites for post-translational modification, leading to diverging subcellular localization and biological function. For example, phosphorylation of Serine 194 on RalA by the kinase Aurora A results in the relocation of RalA to the inner mitochondrial membrane, where RalA helps carry out mitochondrial fission; whereas phosphorylation of Serine 198 on RalB by the kinase PKC results in the relocation of RalB to other internal membranes and activation of its tumorigenic function.

Function 
RalA is one of two proteins in the Ral family, which is itself a subfamily within the Ras family of small GTPases. As a Ras GTPase, RalA functions as a molecular switch that becomes active when bound to GTP and inactive when bound to GDP. RalA can be activated by RalGEFs and, in turn, activate effectors in signal transduction pathways leading to biological outcomes. For instance, RalA interacts with two components of the exocyst, Exo84 and Sec5, to promote autophagosome assembly, secretory vesicle trafficking, and tethering. Other downstream functions include exocytosis, receptor-mediated endocytosis, tight junction biogenesis, filopodia formation, mitochondrial fission, and cytokinesis. Ral-mediated exocytosis is also involved such biological processes as platelet activation, immune cell functions, neuronal plasticity, and regulation of insulin action.

While the above functions appear to be shared between the two Ral isoforms, their differential subcellular localizations result in their differing involvement in certain biological processes. In particular, RalA is more involved in anchorage-independent cell growth, vesicle trafficking, and cytoskeletal organization. Moreover, RalA specifically interacts with Exo84 and Sec5 to regulate transport of membrane proteins in polarized epithelial cells and GLUT4 to the plasma membrane, as well as mitochondrial fission for cell division.

Clinical significance 
Ral proteins have been associated with the progression of several cancers, including bladder cancer and prostate cancer. Though the exact mechanisms remain unclear, studies reveal that RalA promotes anchorage-independent growth in cancer cells. As a result, inhibition of RalA inhibits cancer initiation.

Due to its exocytotic role in platelets, immune cells, neurons, and insulin regulation, downregulation of Ral may lead to pathological conditions such as thrombosis and metabolic syndrome. In chronic thromboembolic pulmonary hypertension patients, Ral GTPases have been observed to be highly active in their platelets.

Interactions 

RalA has been shown to interact with:
EXOC8,
 Filamin,
 PLD1,
Sec5,  and
 RALBP1.

References

Further reading

External links